"Every Morning" may refer to:

"Every Morning" (Sugar Ray song), 1999
"Every Morning" (Basshunter song), 2009
"Every Morning", a song by Crash Test Dummies from I Don't Care That You Don't Mind
"Every Morning", a song by The Cranberries from Wake Up and Smell the Coffee
"Every Morning", a poem by Suman Pokhrel